The 12th BET Awards were held at the Shrine Auditorium in Los Angeles, California on July 1, 2012. The awards recognize Americans in music, acting, sports, and other fields of entertainment over the past year. Actor Samuel L. Jackson hosted the event for the first time. In honor of Whitney Houston, who died earlier in the year, a musical tribute was performed by Monica, Brandy, Gary Houston, Cissy Houston, Chaka Khan, while Mariah Carey shared some personal memories of her longtime friend.

The BET-televised event was watched by 7.42 million viewers and achieved a 3.2 rating in the adult 18-49 demographic, marking the highest numbers for the night on basic cable.

Performers

Nominees and winners
Winners are highlighted in boldface:

FANdemonium Award 
 Chris Brown
 Lil Wayne
 Mindless Behavior
 Nicki Minaj
 Rihanna
 Trey Songz

BET Lifetime Achievement Award 
 Maze featuring Frankie Beverly

BET Humanitarian Award 
 Rev. Al Sharpton

References

External links
 Official website

BET Awards
2012 music awards